This is a list of museums in Argentina.

See also 
 List of archives in Argentina
 List of museums by country

References

 Museos Argentinos 
 Welcome to Argentina: Museums

Argentina
 
Museums
Argentina
Museums
Museums